Associação Atlética Ferroviária, usually called Ferroviária, is a multi-sports and social club from Botucatu in São Paulo state.

They play in red, black and white shirts, white shorts and red socks.

History
The club was founded on May 3, 1939, by club company.

Stadium
The club play their home games at Estádio Acrísio Cruz. The stadium has a maximum capacity of 5,000 people.

Mascot
The club's mascot is a locomotive.

References

External links
Official website

Association football clubs established in 1939
Football clubs in São Paulo (state)
1939 establishments in Brazil